Hills Sports High School is a government-funded co-educational comprehensive and specialist secondary day school, with speciality in sports, located on Best Road, Seven Hills, in the western suburbs of Sydney, New South Wales, Australia.

Established in 1966 as Seven Hills South High School, the school caters to approximately 930 students from Year 7 to Year 12. The school is operated by the New South Wales Department of Education; the principal is Amanda De Carli.

In addition to delivering a comprehensive education, the school has a Talented Sports Program for selected sports and achieved the status of being a selective sports school in 2002. The Hills Sports High School is a member of the NSW Sports High Schools Association.

History 
Hills Sports  was established in 1966 originally as Seven Hills South High School, and later changed to Grantham High School. In 2002, Grantham High School was renamed The Hills Sports High School with strong support of then principal Joe Allan, staff and the community. The Talented Sports Program (TSP) was also introduced in 2002.

Departments
Hills Sports has eleven departments. Years 9 and 10 offer three electives in a structure allowing for 100- and 200-hour courses chosen from all Curriculum areas. Years 11 and 12 offer TAFE VET Courses which can be accessed from 5 TAFE Colleges. Extension courses are offered in English, Mathematics and History. The departments are:

Talented Sports Program
The Hills Sports High School offers a Talented Sports Program (TSP) designed to provide students who excel in particular sports with coaching and an academic framework that enables them to reach both their academic and sporting goals. Applicants go through a rigorous trial process including fitness testing, skills testing and examination of their school reports.

The sports offered by the school include athletics, Australian rules football, baseball, boxing, cricket, golf, netball, rugby league, rugby union, soccer, softball, swimming, tennis, and wrestling. In addition, regular sports include Cross-country running, touch football, hockey, volleyball, and a variety of other recreational sports.

Sports facilities
 Two full sized multi-purpose pitches
 Two outdoor multi-purpose courts
 Indoor gymnasium including one multi-purpose court
 Cricket nets
 Full sized fitness gym including aerobics room, physiotherapy room and office
 School hall with one indoor court
 Two full sized stand alone changerooms
 Extra football training facilities at the Best Rd sports complex
 National Aquatics Training and Safety Facility 
 Full-sized synthetic soccer pitch

Notable alumni 
 Dean Blorerugby league player for the Penrith Panthers and Samoa
 Tim Brasherrugby league player; player for the Kangaroos and New South Wales
 Reagan Campbell Gillard  rugby league player; player for the Kangaroos and New South Wales
 Jake Dorancricket player; played for Tasmania, Hobart Hurricanes and Australia under-19s; previously played for the New South Wales Blues
 Luke Dorancricket player; played for the Sydney Sixers and the New South Wales Blues
 Chloe Logarzosoccer player; played with the Matildas, Washington Spirit and Sydney FC
 Matt Morancelebrity chef
 Kyah Simon international soccer player
 Brandon Starchigh jumper; represented Australia at the 2016 Summer Olympics
 Will Skeltonrugby union player; represented Australia at the 2015 Rugby World Cup
 Teigen Allen-soccer player
 Dylan Brown - rugby player, player for rugby club Parramatta Eels since 2019.
 Paige Hadley -Netballer

See also 

 List of government schools in New South Wales
 Selective school (New South Wales)
 Education in Australia

References

External links
 

1986 establishments in Australia
Public high schools in Sydney
Educational institutions established in 1966
Selective schools in New South Wales
Sports schools in Australia